The No Self-Government Party was a minor Australian Capital Territory political party that experienced limited success in the early years of the Australian Capital Territory Legislative Assembly. Like Dennis Stevenson's Abolish Self-Government Coalition, it opposed self-government for the ACT. In the first territory election in 1989, three members of the No Self-Government Party were elected. None was still a member of the party by the 1992 election, by which time it had ceased to exist.

References

Defunct political parties in the Australian Capital Territory
Political parties established in 1989
Political parties disestablished in 1992
Single-issue political parties
Single-issue political parties in Australia